Sven Groeneveld (born 22 July 1965) is a former Dutch professional tennis player and currently coaches Canadian tennis player Bianca Andreescu.

Career
He became a professional tennis player at the age of 19, but couldn’t achieve much success. His highest singles ranking was 826 and highest doubles ranking was 837 in 1986.

In 1989 he ended his tennis career, and became a coach. He has coached a wide variety of players, including Monica Seles, Arantxa Sánchez Vicario, Mary Pierce, Ana Ivanovic, Caroline Wozniacki, Michael Stich, Greg Rusedski, Nicolas Kiefer, Tommy Haas,  Maria Sharapova and Mario Ančić, among others. He is also the former head of the Swiss Tennis federation. Since May 2019, he has been the coach of Bianca Andreescu.

References

External links
 
 Coach Profile at the Association of Tennis Professionals

1965 births
Living people
Dutch male tennis players
Dutch tennis coaches